Telemilêmio Brasil is a Brazilian producer of films and TV series, having already produced hits such as "Poesias Para Gael", Invisibilia and Depois da Chuva (After The Rain). Often called a producer of LGBT+ content due to the large number of productions for this audience, it is also a producer of general content.  productions, Telemilênio has already produced dramaturgy for broadcasters such as TV Cultura, NGT, among others.

History

The production company of films and series Telemilênio was created in 2005, by the actor and producer Victor Neves, in Nova Friburgo in Rio de Janeiro. In 2012, Telemilênio closed a partnership with TV Cultura and started showing its productions to the whole of Brazil through CineBrasilTV. In 2015, the Perigosos series was shown on cable TV in Brazil, via NGT. In 2017, Telemilênio launched the film "Poesias Para Gael", one of the greatest successes of Brazilian cinema in Brazil, in 2020 the plot was made available for free on YouTube, and has already surpassed the mark of 4 million views.

In addition to productions aimed at the LGBT + public, Telemilênio has already produced dramaturgy for major national televisions such as Rede Record, SBT and TV Cultura. In 2020, Telemilênio became the broadcaster of the pop culture awards BreakTudo Awards.

The cast of the producer Telemilênio has more than 80 actors, among well-known names are Paloma Bernardi, Brenno Leone, Victor Neves e Natalie Sith, Flavio Leimig, Jonas Freze, Magda Rezende, Valma Christina and Malu Falangola .

Television

Awards and Nominations

Rio Webfest

|-
| Rio Webfest 2021
| Vidas Cruzadas
| Incentive to Brazilian Digital Production	 
| 
|-
| Rio Webfest 2021
| Namorando a Sogra 
| Best Performance	 
| 
|-
| Rio Webfest 2021
| Vidas Cruzadas	
| RIOWF Voto Popular	 
| 
|-

Lima Webfest

|-
| Lima Webfest 2021
| Poesias Para Gael 
| Brazilian Digital Production	 
| 
|-
| Lima Webfest 2021
| Namorando A Sogra		
| Brazilian Production	 
| 
|-

References
 

Film production companies of Brazil